Chester D. McNabb (September 19, 1920 – June 14, 1990) was an American professional basketball player. He played in the Basketball Association of America (BAA) for the Baltimore Bullets in just two games during the 1947–48 season. McNabb's only accumulated career statistics are one personal foul and one field goal attempt.

McNabb also played one season of minor league baseball in 1947. He played for the Phoenix Senators in the Arizona–Texas League.

BAA career statistics

Regular season

References

External links

1920 births
1990 deaths
American men's basketball players
Arizona State Sun Devils baseball players
Arizona State Sun Devils men's basketball players
Baltimore Bullets (1944–1954) players
Baseball players from Arizona
Basketball players from Arizona
Forwards (basketball)
High school basketball coaches in Arizona
High school football coaches in Arizona
Phoenix Senators players